Arthur Sinclair Covey (1877–1960) was an American muralist whose paintings depicted industrial workers doing their jobs.

Personal life
Covey was born in Leroy, Illinois on June 13, 1877 
and was married to Mary Dorothea Sale from 1908 until her death in 1917.  In 1921, Covey married the artist and children's book writer Lois Lenski (1893–1974).  Covey and Lenski remained married until his death in 1960.  Covey's daughter from his first marriage Margaret Covey Chisholm was also a painter and muralist.

Education
Covey attended Southwestern College and studied for three years at the School of the Art Institute of Chicago, where he graduated in 1899. He later taught at the School of the Art Institute of Chicago. At the age of 16, Covey participated in the Cherokee Strip Land Run in Oklahoma on September 16, 1893. During his subsequent career as an artist, one of his frequently-reproduced drawings (from 1953) depicted this Cherokee Strip Run.

Works
His works include a 1927 series of images of workers at industries in Toledo, Ohio which were first exhibited in display windows of a Toledo department store, Lasalle & Koch
and 
seven murals showing foundry workers for the Kohler Company in Sheboygan County, Wisconsin.
He was commissioned in 1936 by the Section to paint a mural in Bridgeport, Connecticut  and another in Torrington, Connecticut.

The papers and much of the artwork of Arthur Covey, dating from 1882 to 1960, are stored in a collection at the Archives of American Art of the Smithsonian Institution. In 1929, Covey was elected into the National Academy of Design as an Associate Academician, and became a full Academician in 1934.

Death
Arthur Covey died in Tarpon Springs, Florida on February 5, 1960.

References

External links

19th-century American painters
American male painters
20th-century American painters
1877 births
1960 deaths
American muralists
Painters from Illinois
Southwestern College (Kansas) alumni
School of the Art Institute of Chicago alumni
School of the Art Institute of Chicago faculty
National Academy of Design members
Section of Painting and Sculpture artists
Federal Art Project artists
19th-century American male artists
20th-century American male artists